Loch of Isbister is a loch of Whalsay, Shetland Islands, Scotland, located on the northern side of Isbister on the eastern side of the island.

References

Lochs of Whalsay